Science Verse is a 2004 children's picture book written by Jon Scieszka and illustrated by Lane Smith. It won the Picture Book prize in the 2005 Golden Duck Awards. The book, published by Viking Press, is a follow-up to Math Curse

Plot
This book tells the story - in verse - of a student who, according to his teacher, hears "the poetry of science in everything". Later, the art teacher says their art should be their life, similar to the last line of the preceding book Math Curse.

Poems
In the story, there are several humorous poems about science. They are poems fitted from famous works such as "The Raven", "Twinkle Twinkle Little Star" and "Stopping by the Woods on a Snowy Evening".

CD
A promotional CD (total time 5:12) with Jon Scieszka and Lane Smith reading selections from the book was released by Viking some time shortly before publication of the book on September 27, 2004.

References

2004 children's books
2004 poetry books
American picture books
American poetry collections
Books about science
Children's poetry books
Books about art